The Adventist Medical Center Manila, (formerly Manila Adventist Medical Center; also Manila Sanitarium and Hospital), is an acute care, tertiary, non-stock, non-profit, and self-supporting private hospital that is located within Pasay in Metro Manila, Philippines. It was established in July 1929 by a missionary doctor - Horace Hall. The hospital is part of a chain of more than 500 health care institutions worldwide operated by the Seventh-day Adventist Church. It is licensed by the Center for Health Development of the Philippine Department of Health, accredited by Medicare, the Philippine Hospital Association and the American Hospital Association.

See also

 List of Seventh-day Adventist hospitals
 List of hospitals in the Philippines

References

External links 
 
 Manila Adventist College

1929 establishments in the Philippines
Hospital buildings completed in 1929
Hospitals in Metro Manila
Hospitals affiliated with the Seventh-day Adventist Church
Hospitals established in 1929
Buildings and structures in Pasay
Protestant hospitals in the Philippines
20th-century architecture in the Philippines